Andrew Kratzmann and Mark Kratzmann were the defending champions, but did not participate this year.

Jim Courier and Patrick Rafter won the title, defeating Byron Black and Grant Connell 7–6, 6–4 in the final.

Seeds

  Todd Woodbridge /  Mark Woodforde (semifinals)
  Patrick Galbraith /  Jonathan Stark (quarterfinals)
  Byron Black /  Grant Connell (final)
  David Adams /  Wayne Ferreira (first round)

Draw

Draw

References
Draw

Next Generation Adelaide International
1995 ATP Tour
1995 in Australian tennis